Onursal Uraz (born 1944) is a Turkish footballer. He played in four matches for the Turkey national football team from 1965 to 1966.

References

1944 births
Living people
Turkish footballers
Turkey international footballers
Place of birth missing (living people)
Association footballers not categorized by position